Francesca Galli (born 5 July 1960 in Desio, Monza) is a retired racing cyclist from Italy. She was 7th in the World rad race in 1979 and 4th in the following year. Her biggest achievement was winning the world title in the women's team time trial (1988), alongside Maria Canins, Roberta Bonanomi, and Monica Bandini. She came second the following year.

References

External links

1960 births
Living people
People from Desio
Italian female cyclists
UCI Road World Champions (women)
Cyclists from the Province of Monza e Brianza